Piazza Castello is a prominent city square in Turin, Italy. It houses several city landmarks, museums, theaters and cafes.

Description 

The square is rectangular in shape and houses at its center the architectural complex of Palazzo Madama, while the perimeter is made up of elegant porticoes and facades of several city buildings. These are the Royal Armory (to the north ), the Teatro Regio (to the east), two stately buildings on the sides of Via Garibaldi, one of which houses the headquarters of the Piedmont Region (to the west), the Royal Church of San Lorenzo (to the north-west), the Subapline Gallery (to southeast), and the Torre Littoria (southwest). In the northwest the main square joins the smaller Piazzetta Reale, which houses Palazzo Chiablese, the Royal Palace of Turin, and pedestrian passage towards San Giovanni square and the (Turin Cathedral). The square is located 239 meters above sea level.

Gallery

Buildings around the square 
Royal Palace of Turin
Palazzo Madama, Turin

References 

Piazzas in Turin